The 2012 Challenger ATP de Salinas Diario Expreso was a professional tennis tournament played on hard courts. It was the 17th edition of the tournament which was part of the 2012 ATP Challenger Tour. It took place in Salinas, Ecuador between February 27 and March 4, 2012.

ATP entrants

Seeds

 Rankings are as of February 20, 2012.

Other entrants
The following players received wildcards into the singles main draw:
  Júlio César Campozano
  Juan Carvajal
  Diego Hidalgo
  Juan-Sebastian Vivanco

The following players received entry from the qualifying draw:
  Guillermo Durán
  Iván Endara
  Maximiliano Estévez
  Kevin Kim

Champions

Singles

 Guido Pella def.  Paolo Lorenzi, 1–6, 7–5, 6–3

Doubles

 Martín Alund /  Horacio Zeballos def.  Ariel Behar /  Carlos Salamanca, 6–3, 6–3

External links
Official Website
ITF Search
ATP official site

Challenger ATP de Salinas Diario Expreso
Challenger ATP de Salinas Diario Expreso